Maya Mriga is a 1960 Indian Bengali-language film directed by Chitta Bose. This film released under the banner of MKG Private Production Limited. The film stars Uttam Kumar, Sandhya Roy and Biswajit Chatterjee. It is based on the play of the same name by Nihar Ranjan Gupta.

Plot

Cast 
 Uttam Kumar
 Sunanda Banerjee
 Biswajit Chatterjee
 Sandhya Roy
 Tulsi Chakraborty
 Chhabi Biswas

Remakes
The film was remade in Tamil as Annai and in Hindi as Laadla (1966) and in Malayalam as Amma (1976).

References

External linka 
 

1960 films
1960s Bengali-language films
Bengali-language Indian films
Films based on works by Nihar Ranjan Gupta
Indian films based on plays
Bengali films remade in other languages